In basketball, a foul is an infraction of the rules more serious than a violation.  Most fouls occur as a result of illegal personal contact with an opponent and/or unsportsmanlike behavior.  Fouls can result in one or more of the following penalties:
The team whose player committed the foul loses possession of the ball to the other team.
The fouled player is awarded one or more free throws. 
The player committing the foul "fouls out" of the game.
The player committing the foul is suspended from some number of subsequent games.

Some of the penalties listed above are assessed only if a player or a team commits a number of fouls above a specified limit.

Ordinary fouls are routine because of the constant motion inherent in the sport and are not viewed as bad sportsmanship. The penalty imposes a cost on violating the rules but does not disparage the player committing the foul. A player intending never to commit a foul might play so cautiously as to be ineffective. More serious fouls are regarded as bad sportsmanship, and the penalties are designed to be disciplinary.

There are several classes of foul, each enumerated below and covered in greater detail in its own article.

Classes

Personal

A personal foul is the most common type of foul.  It results from personal contact between two opposing players.
Basketball features constant motion, and contact between opposing players is unavoidable, but significant contact that is the fault of illegal conduct by one opponent is a foul against that player.  Most personal fouls are called against a defensive player.  A personal foul that is committed by a player of the team in possession of the ball is called an offensive foul.  When neither team is in clear possession of the ball, a foul is called a loose-ball foul.

Flagrant

A flagrant foul is violent player contact that the official believes is not a legitimate attempt to directly play the ball within the rules.
The NBA and NCAA men's competitions define a Flagrant-1 foul as unnecessary contact, and two such penalties leads to ejection of the player. A Flagrant-2 foul is contact that is both unnecessary and excessive, and requires ejection. In 2019, the NCAA added more words to describe this scenario, including brutal, harsh or cruel or dangerous or punishing.
FIBA and NCAA women's competitions penalize excessive or unjustified contact between opponents. Their terms for the respective levels of foul are an unsportsmanlike foul and a disqualifying foul.

Technical

A technical foul is a foul unrelated to physical contact during gameplay.  The foul may be called on a player in the game, another player, a coach, or against the team in general.  This class of foul applies to all of the following:
Unsportsmanlike conduct outside the scope of the game, such as taunting, profanity, using offensive racial slurs, or conduct toward an official.
A personal foul committed by a player who has fouled out of the game but is readmitted to the game because of the lack of substitutes.
Breaking the backboard by performing an excessive slam dunk.
Requesting a timeout when the team has already used their last allotted timeout.
Illegal gamesmanship, such as delay of game.
A variety of other situations, such as arranging the players in an illegal defense.
In the last two cases, the rules may call for the referee to give a warning rather than assess a technical foul on the first infraction.

Player and team
A player foul is any foul, but typically personal and flagrant fouls, by reference to the count of fouls charged against a given player.  A team foul is any foul by reference to the count against a given team.

Bonus situation

The bonus (or penalty) situation occurs when one team accumulates a requisite number of fouls. When one team has committed the requisite number of fouls, each subsequent foul results in the opposing team's taking free throws regardless of the type of foul committed.

Coach's challenge
Beginning in the 2019–20 season, the NBA introduced the "coach's challenge" rule, allowing teams one challenge per game. Teams may only challenge personal foul calls on its own players, and out-of-bounds and goaltending/basket interference calls during the first 46 minutes of the game and first 3 minutes of overtime play. Teams must call a legal timeout to challenge a call, which will be returned if the challenge is successful. When a call is challenged, instant replay footage is reviewed by game officials to determine whether the call should be overturned. Teams may only challenge once per game regardless of whether the challenge was successful.

Starting in the 2021–22 season, coaches in the Euroleague and EuroCup Basketball are given one challenge per game.

On October 1, 2022, FIBA published a revision of its official rules of basketball adding a "head coach challenge". Similar to the NBA and Euroleague, each coach is given one challenge per game.

References

External links
Official Basketball Rules 2018 (PDF); FIBA
The NBA "officiating" page contains the entire rulebook (PDF) and summaries of misunderstood rules and recent changes.

Basketball statistics
Basketball penalties

es:Falta personal
fr:Faute personnelle (basket-ball)
it:Fallo personale
ja:ファウル (バスケットボール)
pl:Błędy w koszykówce#Faule